Richard Cupper or Couper (by 1519 – 1583/84), of London; Powick and Worcester, Worcestershire, was an English politician.

He was a Member (MP) of the Parliament of England for Leominster in 1547, for Old Sarum in April 1554 and for Lichfield in 1558.

References

1580s deaths
Politicians from London
Members of the Parliament of England for Worcester
Year of birth uncertain
English MPs 1547–1552
English MPs 1554
English MPs 1558